Fairfield is a suburb of Dunedin, New Zealand.

Fairfield lies in rolling hill country, close to the slopes of Saddle Hill and Scroggs Hill. The name Fairfield was originally given as a descriptive name by early European settler William Martin to his farm property, located close to where the town now stands.

Under the 1989 local government reforms, the city of Dunedin and its surrounding region was grouped into a territorial authority called Dunedin City. Under this system, Fairfield is officially an outer suburb within this territorial authority.

Until 2000, Fairfield was located on State Highway 1, but is now on a bypass of the Dunedin Southern Motorway.

As of the 2013 New Zealand census (delayed from 2011 due to the 2011 Christchurch earthquake), Fairfield had a population of 2,379 – an increase of 5.0% from the population of 2,275 in the 2006 census. Fairfield accounts for 2.0% of the total Dunedin City territorial authority population. 

The local primary school is Fairfield School.

Demographics

Fairfield had a population of 2,511 at the 2018 New Zealand census, an increase of 96 people (4.0%) since the 2013 census, and an increase of 243 people (10.7%) since the 2006 census. There were 933 households. There were 1,263 males and 1,248 females, giving a sex ratio of 1.01 males per female. The median age was 44.3 years (compared with 37.4 years nationally), with 462 people (18.4%) aged under 15 years, 402 (16.0%) aged 15 to 29, 1,227 (48.9%) aged 30 to 64, and 423 (16.8%) aged 65 or older.

Ethnicities were 93.0% European/Pākehā, 6.8% Māori, 1.1% Pacific peoples, 4.1% Asian, and 1.7% other ethnicities (totals add to more than 100% since people could identify with multiple ethnicities).

The proportion of people born overseas was 11.7%, compared with 27.1% nationally.

Although some people objected to giving their religion, 56.3% had no religion, 36.0% were Christian, 0.4% were Hindu, 0.2% were Muslim, 0.1% were Buddhist and 1.3% had other religions.

Of those at least 15 years old, 378 (18.4%) people had a bachelor or higher degree, and 339 (16.5%) people had no formal qualifications. The median income was $38,700, compared with $31,800 nationally. 426 people (20.8%) earned over $70,000 compared to 17.2% nationally. The employment status of those at least 15 was that 1,104 (53.9%) people were employed full-time, 360 (17.6%) were part-time, and 42 (2.0%) were unemployed.

Education
Fairfield School is a full primary serving years 1 to 8 with a roll of  students. It was established in 1872 as Waldron School. A fire destroyed the school in 1951, and it was rebuilt on the current site in 1963.

Te Kura Kaupapa Māori o Ōtepoti is a composite school serving years 1 to 13 with a roll of  students. The school was founded in 1994, and teaches entirely in the Māori language.

Both schools are coeducational. Rolls are as of

References

Populated places in Otago
Suburbs of Dunedin